Rosehill is a rural locality in the Southern Downs Region, Queensland, Australia.

History 
The locality takes its name from Rosehill railway station (previously known as Lyndhurt Road, then Lyndhurst, and renamed to Rosehill in September 1885). The name refers to a local big hill covered in rosemary bush.

Rosehill Provisional School opened circa 1890 but closed circa 1899. On 21 January 19091 it reopened, becoming Rosehill State School on 1 January 1909. It closed in 1940, but reopened on 29 January 1952 as Rose Hill State School. It closed permanently on 31 December 1966.

Lyndhurst State School opened in January 1913, but was soon renamed Mount Gordon State School. It closed on 4 April 1985.

References

Further reading 

  — includes Inverleigh School, Allan / Sandy Creek School, Rookwood School, Mountside School, Rosenthal School, and Rose Hill School

Southern Downs Region
Localities in Queensland